Gilbert Spur (‘Rid Gilbert’ \'rid 'gil-b&rt\) is the mostly ice-covered ridge extending 3.9 km in north–south direction, 2.3 km wide and rising to 1791 m at the confluence of Bender Glacier and Nimitz Glacier, in the southern part of Sentinel Range in Ellsworth Mountains, Antarctica.

The peak is named after Joseph Gilbert (1732-1821), Master of HMS Resolution during the 1772-75 exploration voyage of James Cook, who, along with William Hodges, produced the first paintings from the Antarctic region.

Location
US mapping in 1961 and 1988.

Maps
 Vinson Massif.  Scale 1:250 000 topographic map.  Reston, Virginia: US Geological Survey, 1988.
 Antarctic Digital Database (ADD). Scale 1:250000 topographic map of Antarctica. Scientific Committee on Antarctic Research (SCAR). Since 1993, regularly updated.

Notes

References
 Gilbert Spur. SCAR Composite Gazetteer of Antarctica.
 Bulgarian Antarctic Gazetteer. Antarctic Place-names Commission. (details in Bulgarian, basic data in English)

External links
 Gilbert Spur. Adjusted Copernix satellite image

Ellsworth Mountains
Bulgaria and the Antarctic
Ridges of Ellsworth Land